Mackertich "Mac" Joachim (1925–2013) was an Indian boxer who competed in the 1948 Summer Olympics. Joachim was born as Mackertich Hovakimian in 1925 in Calcutta, Bengal Presidency, British India to an Armenian father who had settled there. He later settled in England where he pursued a professional boxing career. Joachim died in 2013 in Kingston upon Thames, London.

References

External links
 

1925 births
2013 deaths
Sportspeople from Kolkata
Indian people of Armenian descent
Boxers at the 1948 Summer Olympics
Indian male boxers
Light-heavyweight boxers
Olympic boxers of India
Indian emigrants to England
British people of Armenian descent